"Aliihoeflea aestuarii" is a Gram-negative and rod-shaped bacterium from the genus "Aliihoeflea" which has been isolated from tidal flat sediments in Korea.

References

Phyllobacteriaceae
Bacteria described in 2008